Galyon Hone (died 1552) was a glazier from Bruges who worked for Henry VIII of England at Hampton Court and in other houses making stained glass windows. His work involved replacing the heraldry and ciphers of Henry VIII's wives in windows when the king remarried.

Career
He joined the Guild of St Luke in Antwerp in 1492.

In England, Hone was made the King's glazier in succession to Barnard Flower. Hone made glass for Eton College and King's College Chapel, Cambridge. Three design drawings for the King's College windows are held by Bowdoin College, Maine, and can be related to contracts made by Galyon Hone and other glaziers in 1526. A design for stained glass in known as a "vidumus". The drawings at Bowdoin are in the manner of Dirck Vellert, an artist who worked in Antwerp.

He lived in the parish of St Mary Magdalene and then in Southwark. There was a community of artists and craftsmen from Holland and the Netherlands, and in 1547 Hone was mentioned in the will of his friend, the court goldsmith Cornelis Hayes. Hone and the printer John Siberch were overseers of the will of a German painter living in Bermondsey, Henry Blankstone. Blankstone painted renaissance style borders and royal ciphers in the Long Gallery at Hampton Court.

In 1533 Galyon Hone's work at Hampton Court included heraldic glass:In the two great windows in the at the ends of the hallis two great arms with four beasts in them ... Also in the said windows in the hall is 30 of the King and Queens arms ... also badges of the King and Queen ... also 77 sceptres with the King's word ... glazing 11 side windows ...in the gable window at the east end the Queen's arms new set.

Galyon Hone supplied heraldic glass before February 1534 for Henry VIII at Hunsdon House, Hertfordshire.  In 1534 he made some repairs at Woking Palace and at Westenhanger where he glazed the windows of chamber for Princess Mary and her maidens. Hone reworked old glass in the chapel at Leeds Castle in 1536. In 1541 Hone made windows for the presence chamber and watching chamber at Hampton Court, and provided glass for Henry's palace at The More.

He had a son, Gerrard Hone, who was also a glazier working in England. Gerrard Hone married Marion, a niece of the royal carpenter Thomas Stockton, and widow of Jasper Rolfe.

During restoration work at Hampton Court in the 1840s by the glazier Thomas Willement, some stained glass, possibly by Galyon Hone, was recovered and removed. It was presented  to the church of St Alban at Earsdon, near Whitley Bay by Lord Hastings of Delavel Hall in 1878.

Withcote and Roger Ratcliffe
Surviving windows at Withcote Chapel near Oakham may have been made by Galyon Hone. They were made for Roger Ratcliffe (died 1537), a former member of the household of Catherine of Aragon, and his wife Catherine, widow of William Smith alias Heriz, and daughter of William Ashby. The glass includes their heraldry and the phoenix badge of Jane Seymour. The attribution is based on the Flemish character of the painting, the use of royal insignia, and Ratcliffe's connection to the Henrician court.

Roger Ratcliffe attended the queen at the Field of the Cloth of Gold in 1520, and was described as an usher of the privy chamber to Henry VIII in the Eltham Ordinance. He went to Scotland in 1524 with Doctor Magnus to meet the king's sister Margaret Tudor. Ratcliffe's role was to amuse her son, the young James V of Scotland. They brought Henry's gift to Margaret, a length of cloth of gold, and a sword for James. They saw the king dance, sing, ride, run with a spear, and his other excellent "princely actes and doinggs". The mission was managed by Cardinal Wolsey. Henry VIII allowed Ratcliffe to take building materials from Rockingham Castle to Withcote in 1534.

Drawings for Cardinal Wolsey
A surviving set of drawings seems to relate to Cardinal Wolsey's windows in the chapel at Hampton Court, and are held by the Royal Museums of Fine Arts of Belgium. A design for stained glass is known as a "vidimus". The drawings may have been sent to Wolsey by an artist in Flanders, in the circle of Erhard Schön, and the glass made in London by the glazier James Nicholson. Hone altered the chapel windows by including the badges of Anne Boleyn and subsequently Jane Seymour. The windows were taken down by iconoclasts in 1645.

References

External links
 Glass at Withcote, Corpus Vitrearum Medii Aevi, CVMA
 Glass at King's College Chapel, Cambridge, Corpus Vitrearum Medii Aevi, CVMA
 Earsdon Church and the glass from Hampton Court, Northernvicar’s Blog
 Three designs for stained glass, Bowdoin College

People from Bruges
Court of Henry VIII
1552 deaths
Renaissance architecture in England
Glaziers
English stained glass artists and manufacturers
Hampton Court Palace
Material culture of royal courts